"Generations" is the second single by Japanese voice actor Tetsuya Kakihara. It was released under Kiramune on September 18, 2013.

Single recording content

References

2013 singles